Domino, is a 1988 Italian erotic drama film directed by Ivana Massetti.

Plot
Domino is an attractive and enigmatic woman of thirty, video director, who is empty without love in her life. When a mysterious caller provocatively stimulates her deepest yearnings 
she change her life style to transform her most intimate dreams and desires into an erotic reality.

Cast

 Brigitte Nielsen as Domino
 Tomas Arana as Gavros
 Kim Rossi Stuart as Eugene
 Stéphane Ferrara as Paul Du Lac
 David Warbeck as 'Blind'
 Geretta Geretta as Gabriele
 Antonella Tinazzo as Marie
 Sheila Constantini Folli as Alice
 Pascal Druant as Victor
 Cyrus Elias as Alex
 Joy Garrison as Billie Holiday

See also
 List of Italian films of 1988

References

External links
 
 

1988 films
1980s Italian-language films
Italian erotic drama films
1980s erotic drama films
Cultural depictions of Billie Holiday
1988 drama films
1980s Italian films